Amman Arab University is a private university in Amman, Jordan. It is mainly for graduate studies.

Colleges
 College of Education and Psychological Sciences
 College of Information Technology
 College of Business
 College of Law
 College of Pharmacy
 College of Engineering

Presidents 

 Said Al-Tal (2000-2012)
 Amin Mahmoud (2013-2013)
 "Muhammad Subhi" Abu-Salih (2013-2013) (acting president)
 Farid Abu Zina (2013-2014) (acting president)
 Mahmoud Al-Sheyyab (2014-2014)
 "Mohamed Nazieh" Hamdi (2014-2014) (acting president)
 Omar Al-Jarrah (2014-2016)
 Ghassan Kanaan (2016-2017) acting
 Maher Saleem (2017-2020)
 Khaled Al Tarawneh (2020-2020) acting
 Mohammad Al-Widyan (current president)

References

External links
 Amman Arab University website

 
Educational institutions established in 1999
Universities in Jordan
Amman Governorate
1999 establishments in Jordan